The Tribeca Festival is an annual film festival organized by Tribeca Productions. It takes place each spring in New York City, showcasing a diverse selection of film, episodic, talks, music, games, art, and immersive programming. Tribeca was founded by Robert De Niro, Jane Rosenthal, and Craig Hatkoff in 2002 to spur the economic and cultural revitalization of Lower Manhattan following the September 11 attacks on the World Trade Center. Until 2020, the festival was known as the Tribeca Film Festival.

Each year, the festival hosts over 600 screenings with approximately 150,000 attendees, and awards independent artists in 23 juried competitive categories.

History

The Tribeca Film Festival was founded in 2002 by Jane Rosenthal, Robert De Niro, and Craig Hatkoff, in response to the September 11 attacks on the World Trade Center and the consequent loss of vitality in the Tribeca neighborhood in Lower Manhattan.
The inaugural festival launched after 120 days of planning with the help of more than 1,300 volunteers. It was attended by more than 150,000 people and featured several up-and-coming filmmakers. The festival included juried narrative, documentary and short film competitions; a restored classics series; a best of New York series curated by Martin Scorsese; 13 major panel discussions; an all-day family festival; and the premieres of studio films Star Wars: Episode II – Attack of the Clones, About A Boy, the American remake of Insomnia, Divine Secrets of the Ya-Ya Sisterhood, and The League of Extraordinary Gentlemen.

The 2003 festival brought more than 300,000 people. The festival showcased an expanded group of independent features, documentaries and short films from around the world, coupled with studio premieres, panel discussions, music and comedy concerts, a family festival, sports activities, and outdoor movie screenings along the Hudson River. The family festival featured children's movie screenings, storytelling, family panels, workshops, and interactive games culminating in a daylong street fair that drew a crowd estimated at 250,000 people.

At the end of 2003, De Niro purchased the theater at 54 Varick Street which had housed the recently closed Screening Room, an art house that had shown independent films nightly, renaming it the Tribeca Cinema. It became one of the venues of the festival.

In an effort to serve its mission of bringing independent film to the widest possible audience, in 2006, the festival expanded its reach in New York City and internationally. In New York City, Tribeca hosted screenings throughout Manhattan as the festival's 1,000-plus screening schedule outgrew the capacity downtown. Internationally, the Festival brought films to the Rome Film Festival. As part of the celebrations in Rome, Tribeca was awarded the first-ever "Steps and Stars" award, presented on the Spanish Steps. A total of 169 feature films and 99 shorts were selected from 4,100 film submissions, including 1,950 feature submissions—three times the total submissions from the first festival in 2002. The festival featured 90 world premieres, nine international premieres, 31 North American premieres, 6 U.S. premieres, and 28 New York City premieres.

In 2009, Rosenthal, Hatkoff and De Niro were named number 14 on Barron's list of the world's top 25 philanthropists for their role in regenerating TriBeCa's economy after September 11.

In 2011, L.A. Noire became the first video game to be recognized by the Tribeca Film Festival. In 2013, Beyond: Two Souls, featuring Elliot Page and Willem Dafoe, became only the second game to be premiered at the festival.

The 19th Tribeca Film Festival, originally scheduled for April 15–26, 2020, was cancelled due to the COVID-19 pandemic. In the weeks and months that followed, Tribeca launched several digital offerings to highlight filmmakers and creators who had hoped to premiere their latest works at the spring gathering. It provided a secure digital platform for 2020 Festival films seeking distribution to be viewed by press and industry and hosted a virtual gathering space for Tribeca N.O.W. Creators Market.

In response to the global pandemic, Tribeca organized We Are One in partnership with YouTube, a free 10-day digital festival that provided entertainment and connection for audiences at home and raised international COVID-19 relief funds. The program was co-curated by 21 of the top international film festivals including Cannes, Sundance, TIFF and Venice and showcased over 100 hours of shorts, features, talks and music to an audience of 1.9 million people in 179 countries.

In July 2020, Tribeca launched one of the first large scale pop-up drive-in series across the country to provide audiences with entertainment in a safe, socially-distanced environment. Screenings took place at the Rose Bowl in Pasadena, CA, Dallas Cowboys AT&T Stadium in Arlington, Texas, Orchard Beach in the Bronx neighborhood of New York and Nickerson Beach in Nassau County, New York. The series employed local production staff and partnered with small food businesses who had been impacted by the lockdown.

On August 7, 2020, organizers announced that the 20th anniversary edition of the festival was to be held from June 9 to June 20, 2021, with a dedicated space to celebrate films whose premieres were not able to take place in the festival that was cancelled in 2020. In a first for the festival, Tribeca also hosted community screenings — in both indoor and outdoor venues — in all five New York City boroughs.

The festival added a dedicated video games category beginning with the 2021 event. Games nominated are presented in online presentations during the Festival, similar to film screenings. The festival dropped "Film" from its name.

Awards

U.S. Narrative Competition

Best U.S. Narrative Feature

 2021 – The Novice, written and directed by Lauren Hadaway
2020 – The Half of It, directed by Alice Wu
 2019 – Burning Cane, written and directed by Phillip Youmans
 2018 – Diane, written and directed by Kent Jones
 2017 – Keep the Change, written and directed by Rachel Israel
 2016 – Dean, directed by Demetri Martin

Best Actor in a U.S. Narrative Feature Film
 2021 – Matthew Leone in God’s Waiting Room
 2020 – Steve Zahn in Cowboys
 2019 – Wendell Pierce in Burning Cane
 2018 – Jeffrey Wright in O.G
 2017 – Alessandro Nivola in One Percent More Humid
 2016 – Dominic Rains in Burn Country

Best Actress in a U.S. Narrative Feature Film
 2021 – Isabelle Furman in The Novice
 2020 – Assol Abdulina in Materna
 2019 – Haley Bennett in Swallow
 2018 – Alia Shawkat in Duck Butter
 2017 – Nadia Alexander in Blame
 2016 – Mackenzie Davis in Always Shine

Best Cinematography in a U.S. Narrative Feature Film
 2021 – Todd Martin for The Novice
 2020 – Greta Zozula, Chananun Chotrungroj and Kelly Jeffrey for Materna
 2019 – Phillip Youmans for Burning Cane
 2018 – Wyatt Garfield for Diane
 2017 – Chris Teague for Love After Love
 2016 – Michael Ragen for Kicks

Best Screenplay in a U.S. Narrative Feature Film
 2021 – Mark, Mary, and Some Other People, written by Hannah Marks
 2020 – Cowboys, written by Anna Kerrigan
 2019 – Blow the Man Down, written by Bridget Savage Cole and Danielle Krudy
 2018 – Diane, written by Kent Jones
 2017 – Abundant Acreage Available, written by Angus MacLachlan
 2016 – Women Who Kill, written by Ingrid Jungermann

World Narrative Competition

Best Narrative Feature
 2021 – Brighton 4th, directed by Levan Koguashvili
 2020 – The Hater, directed by Jan Komasa
 2019 – Scheme Birds, directed by Ellen Fiske and Ellinor Hallin
 2017 – Son of Sofia (O Gios tis Sofias) written and directed by Elina Psykou
 2016 – Junction 48, directed by Udi Aloni
 2015 – Virgin Mountain, directed by Dagur Kári
 2014 – Zero Motivation, directed by Talya Lavie
 2013 – The Rocket, directed by Kim Mordaunt
 2012 – War Witch, directed by Kim Nguyen
 2011 – She Monkeys, directed by Lisa Aschan
 2010 – When We Leave, directed by Feo Aladag
 2009 – About Elly, directed by Asghar Farhadi
 2008 – Let the Right One In, directed by Tomas Alfredson
 2007 – My Father My Lord, directed by David Volach
 2006 – Iluminados por el fuego, directed by Tristán Bauer
 2005 – Stolen Life, directed by Li Shaohong
 2004 – Green Hat, directed by Liu Fendou
 2003 – Blind Shaft, directed by Li Yang
 2002 – Roger Dodger, directed by Dylan Kidd

Best New Narrative Filmmaker
 2021 – Nana Mensah for Queen of Glory
 2020 – Gaspar Antillo for Nobody Knows I'm Here
 2019 – Ellen Fiske and Ellinor Hallin for Scheme Birds
 2017 – Rachel Israel, director of Keep the Change
 2015 – Zachary Treitz for Men Go to Battle
 2014 – Josef Wladyka for Manos Sucias
 2013 – Emanuel Hoss-Desmarais for Whitewash
 2012 – Lucy Mulloy, Una Noche
 2011 – Park Jung-bum for The Journals of Musan
 2010 – Kim Chapiron for Dog Pound
 2009 – Rune Denstad Langlo for North
 2008 – Huseyin Karabey for My Marlon and Brando
 2007 – Enrique Begne for Two Embraces
 2006 – Marwan Hamed for The Yacoubian Building
 2005 – Alicia Scherson for Play
 2004 – Liu Fendou for Green Hat
 2003 – Valeria Bruni Tedeschi for It's Easier for a Camel...
 2002 – Eric Eason for Manito

Best Actor in a Narrative Feature Film
 2021 – Levan Tediashvili in Brighton 4th
 2020 – Noé Hernández in Kokoloko
 2017 – Guillermo Pfening in Nobody's Watching (Nadie Nos Mira)
 2015 – Gunnar Jónsson for Virgin Mountain
 2014 – Paul Schneider for Goodbye to All That
 2013 – Sitthiphon Disamoe, The Rocket
 2012 – Dariel Arrechada and Javier Nuñez Florian, Una Noche
 2011 – Ramadhan "Shami" Bizimana in Grey Matter
 2010 – Eric Elmosnino in Gainsbourg (Vie héroïque)
 2009 – Ciarán Hinds in The Eclipse
 2008 – Thomas Turgoose and Piotr Jagiello for their roles in Somers Town
 2007 – Lofti Ebdelli in Making Of. (Akher film)
 2006 – Jürgen Vogel in Der Freie Wille
 2005 – Cees Geel in Simon
 2004 – Ian Hart in Blind Flight
 2003 – Igor Bareš in Výlet and Ohad Knoller in Yossi & Jagger

Best Actress in a Narrative Feature Film
 2021 – Bassant Ahmed & Basmala Elghaiesh in Souad
 2020 – Shira Haas in Asia
 2019 – Park Ji-hu in House of Hummingbird
 2017 – Marie Leuenberger in The Divine Order (Die göttliche Ordnung)
 2016 – Radhika Apte in Madly (Section : Clean Shaven)
 2015 – Hannah Murray in Bridgend
 2014 – Valeria Bruni Tedeschi in Human Capital
 2013 – Veerle Baetens in The Broken Circle Breakdown
 2012 – Rachel Mwanza in War Witch
 2011 – Carice van Houten in Black Butterflies
 2010 – Sibel Kekilli in When We Leave
 2009 – Zoe Kazan in The Exploding Girl
 2008 – Eileen Walsh in Eden
 2007 – Marina Hands in Lady Chatterley
 2006 – Eva Holubová in Holiday Makers
 2005 – Felicity Huffman in Transamerica
 2004 – Fernanda Montenegro in O Outro Lado da Rua
 2003 – Valeria Bruni Tedeschi in It's Easier for a Camel...
Best Cinematography
 2021 – Elisabeth Vogler for Roaring 20’s 
 2020 – Daniella Nowitz for Asia
 2017 – Elvira Lind for Bobbi Jene
 2015 – Magnus Jønck for Bridgend
 2014 – Damian García for Gueros
 2013 – Marius Matzow Gulbrandsen for Before Snowfall
 2012 – Trevor Forrest and Shlomo Godder for Una Noche
 2011 – Lisa Tillinger for Artificial Paradises

Best Screenplay
 2021 – Brighton 4th, written by Boris Frumin
 2020 – Tryst with Destiny, written by Prashant Nair
 2017 – Ice Mother (Bába z ledu) written by Bohdan Sláma
 2015 – Dagur Kári for Virgin Mountain
 2014 – Guillaume Nicloux for The Kidnapping of Michel Houellebecq
 2013 – Carl Joos and Felix Van Groeningen for The Broken Circle Breakdown
 2012 – Daniel Burman and Sergio Dubcovsky for La suerte en tus manos
 2011 – Jannicke Systad Jacobsen for Turn Me On, Dammit!

Best Narrative Editing
 2015 – Oliver Bugge Coutté for Bridgend
 2014 – Keith Miller for Five Star

Best Documentary Feature
 2020 – Socks on Fire, directed by Bo McGuire
 2017 – Bobbi Jene, directed by Elvira Lind
 2015 – Democrats, directed by Camilla Nielsson
 2014 – Point and Shoot, directed by Marshall Curry
 2013 – The Kill Team, directed by Dan Krauss
 2012 – The World Before Her, directed by Nisha Pahuja
 2011 – Bombay Beach, directed by Alma Har'el
 2010 – Monica & David, directed by Alexandra Codina
 2009 – Racing Dreams, directed by Marshall Curry
 2008 – Pray the Devil Back to Hell, directed by Gini Reticker
 2007 – Taxi to the Dark Side, directed by Alex Gibney
 2006 – The War Tapes, directed by Deborah Scranton
 2005 – El Perro Negro: Stories from the Spanish Civil War, directed by Péter Forgács
 2004 – Kill Your Idols, directed by Scott Crary
 2003 – A Normal Life, directed by Elizabeth Chai Vasarhelyi and Hugo Berkeley
 2002 – Chiefs, directed by Daniel Junge

Best New Documentary Filmmaker
 2020 – Jessica Earnshaw for Jacinta
 2017 – Sarita Khurana and Smriti Mundhra for A Suitable Girl
 2016 – David Feige for Untouchable
 2015 – Ewan McNicol and Anna Sandilands for Uncertain
 2014 – Alan Hicks for Keep On Keepin' On
 2013 – Sean Dunne for Oxyana
 2011 – Pablo Croce for Like Water
 2010 – Clio Barnard for The Arbor
 2009 – Ian Olds for Fixer: The Taking of Ajmal Naqshbandi
 2008 – Carlos Carcass for Old Man Bebo
 2007 – Vardan Hovhannisyan for A Story of People in War and Peace
 2006 – Pelin Esmer for The Play
 2005 – Jeff Zimbalist and Matt Mochary for Favela Rising
 2004 – Paulo Sacramento for The Prisoner of the Iron Bars: Self-Portraits

Best Cinematography in a Documentary 
 2022 – Boris Levy for The Wild One

Best Documentary Editing 
 2020 – Amy Foete for Father, Soldier, Son
 2017 – Adam Nielson for Bobbi Jene

Best Narrative Short
 2020 – No More Wings, directed by Abraham Adeyemi
 2017 – Retouch, directed by Kaveh Mazaheri
 2015 – Listen, directed by Hamy Ramezan and Rungano Nyoni
 2014 – The Phone Call, directed by Mat Kirkby
 2013 – The Nightshift Belongs to the Stars, directed by Edoardo Ponti
 2010 – Father Christmas Doesn't Come Here, written by Bongi Ndaba, Sibongile Nkosana directed by Bekhi Sibiya
 2009 – The North Road, directed by Carlos Chahine
 2008 – New Boy, directed by Steph Green
 2007 – The Last Dog in Rwanda, directed by Jens Assur
 2006 – The Shovel, directed by Nick Childs
 2005 – Cashback, directed by Sean Ellis
 2004 – Shock Act, directed by Seth Grossman
 2002 – Bamboleho, directed by Luis Prieto

Best Documentary Short
 2022 – Heart Valley, directed by Christian Cargill
 2021 – Coded, directed by Ryan White
 2020 – My Father The Mover, directed by Julia Jansch
 2017 – The Good Fight, directed by Ben Holman
 2015 – Body Team 12, directed by David Darg
 2014 – One Year Lease, directed by Brian Bolster
 2013 – Coach, directed by Bess Kargman
 2010 – White Lines and the Fever: The Death of DJ Junebug, directed by Travis Senger
 2009 – Home, directed by Mathew Faust
 2008 – Mandatory Service, directed by Jessica Habie
 2007 – A Son's Sacrifice, directed by Yoni Brook
 2006 – Native New Yorker, directed by Steve Bilich
 2005 – The Life of Kevin Carter, directed by Dan Krauss
 2004 – Sister Rose's Passion, directed by Oren Jacoby
 2003 – Milton Rogovin: The Forgotten Ones, directed by Harvey Wang
 2002 – All Water Has a Perfect Memory, directed by Natalia Almada

Student Visionary Award
 2021 – Six Nights, directed by Robert Brogden
 2020 – Cru-Raw, directed by David Oesch
 2017 – Fry Day, directed by Laura Moss
 2015 – Catwalk, directed by Ninja Thyberg
 2014 – Nesma's Bird, directed by Najwan Ali and Medoo Ali
 2013 – Life Doesn't Frighten Me, directed by Stephen Dunn
 2010 – some boys don't leave, directed by Maggie Kiley
 2009 – Small Change, directed by Anna McGrath
 2008 – Elephant Garden, directed by Sasie Sealy
 2007 – Good Luck Nedim, directed by Marko Santic and Someone Else's War, directed by Lee Wang
 2006 – Dead End Job, directed by Samantha Davidson Green
 2005 – Dance Mania Fantastic, directed by Sasie Sealy
 2004 – 'Independent Lens' (American Made), directed by Sharat Raju

Nora Ephron Prize
 2020 – Ruthy Pribar for Asia
 2019 – Rania Attieh for Initials S.G.
 2018 – Nia DaCosta, for Little Woods
 2017 – Petra Volpe, writer/director of The Divine Order
 2016 – Rachel Tunnard for Adult Life Skills
 2015 – Laura Bispuri for Sworn Virgin
 2014 – Talya Lavie for Zero Motivation
 2013 – Meera Menon for Farah Goes Bang

Best Animated Short 
 2017 – Odd is an Egg (Odd er et egg) directed by Kristin Ulseth

Storyscapes Award
 2017 — TREEHUGGER : WAWONA created by Barnaby Steel, Ersin Han Ersin and Robin McNicholas

Audience Awards

Narrative Award 
 2021 – Catch the Fair One, written and directed by Josef Kubota Wladyka
 2019 – Plus One, written and directed by Jeff Chan and Andrew Rhymer
 2018 – To Dust, directed by Shawn Snyder
 2017 – The Divine Order, directed by Petra Volpe
 2016 – Here Alone, directed by Rod Blackhurst

Documentary Award 
 2021 – Blind Ambition, directed by Warwick Ross and Robert Coe
 2019 – Gay Chorus Deep South, directed by David Charles Rodrigues
 2018 – United Skates, directed by Dyana Winkler and Tina Brown
 2017 – Hondros, directed by Greg Campbell
 2016 – The Return, directed by Kelly Duane and Katie Galloway

Tribeca Games Award 
The Tribeca Games Award honors an unreleased video game, recognizing "its potential for excellence in art and storytelling through design, artistic mastery and highly immersive worlds." 
 2021 – Norco (inaugural award)

See also

 Tribeca Film Institute

References

External links

 

Film festivals in New York City
Film festivals established in 2002
2002 establishments in New York City
Impact of the COVID-19 pandemic on cinema
Impact of the September 11 attacks on cinema
Film Festival
Robert De Niro